The Strunk–Nyssen House is a home/hotel/brewery built by two brewers in Jackson Township, Minnesota, United States (near the city of Shakopee). Herman Strunk, a German immigrant, staked his claim here in 1854 and began brewing beer in 1856. Franz Hubert Nyssen was born in 1843 in de boyen, Grevenbicht, Limburg, Netherlands. He immigrated to America in 1869 and worked for Andrew Winker, owner of the Shakopee Brewery at the time. When Winker died in 1899, Nyssen bought the brewery. The brick portion of the home was built in 1856 and a stone addition was added in 1880.

References

Beer brewing companies based in Minnesota
Houses completed in 1856
Houses on the National Register of Historic Places in Minnesota
Houses in Scott County, Minnesota
National Register of Historic Places in Scott County, Minnesota